Ketripor Hill (‘Halm Ketripor’ \'h&lm 'ke-tri-por\) is the ice-covered hill rising to 800 m in northwestern Trinity Island in the Palmer Archipelago, Antarctica. It surmounts Saldobisa Cove to the northwest and Olusha Cove to the southwest, and has steep and partly ice-free north and east slopes. The hill is named after the Thracian King Ketripor, 352-347 BC.

Location
British mapping in 1978.

Maps
 British Antarctic Territory. Scale 1:200000 topographic map. DOS 610 – W 63 60. Tolworth, UK, 1978.
 Antarctic Digital Database (ADD). Scale 1:250000 topographic map of Antarctica. Scientific Committee on Antarctic Research (SCAR). Since 1993, regularly upgraded and updated.

Notes

References
 Ketripor Hill. SCAR Composite Gazetteer of Antarctica.
 Bulgarian Antarctic Gazetteer. Antarctic Place-names Commission. (details in Bulgarian, basic data in English)

External links
 Ketripor Hill. Copernix satellite image

Mountains of the Palmer Archipelago
Bulgaria and the Antarctic
Trinity Island